Churton is a surname. Notable people with the surname include:

Edward Churton (1800–1874), English clergyman and scholar
Edward Churton (bishop) (1841–1912), bishop of Nassau
Henry Churton (1843–1904), bishop of Nassau
Maud Churton Braby, born Maud Churton (1876–1932), English author born in China 
Ralph Churton (1764–1831), English clergyman, academic and biographer
Theodore Churton (1853–1915), English clergyman
Tobias Churton, British scholar
William Churton (died 1767), American surveyor
William Ralph Churton (1837–1897), English clergyman